The 2019 Shute Shield season is 146th season of a premier rugby union competition in Sydney and the 97th season of the Shute Shield. The 2019 season is featuring 11 teams, following Penrith's cutting from the competition in 2018. The premiers were Sydney University, defeating Warringah by 5 points in the grand final, held at Bankwest Stadium.

Competition format

The 2019 Shute Shield season will be played across 18 rounds, with each team playing each other once and eight other teams twice in a home and away format. This will be followed by a six-team play-off post season, culminating with a grand final on 24 August.

Teams

Standings

 Source: Shute Shield

Play-offs

Week 1

Week 2

Grand Final

References

External links
 Rugby Australia
 Shute Shield

Shute Shield season
S